Simon Peter Rimmer (born 5 May 1963) is an English celebrity chef, best known for his on-screen partnership with Tim Lovejoy.

Early life
Simon Peter Rimmer was born on 5 May 1963 in Wallasey.

Career
Rimmer originally studied fashion and textile design, and later taught himself to cook. In 1990, he bought Greens, a vegetarian restaurant in West Didsbury. He opened his second restaurant, Earle, in Hale in October 2006, though this was sold to a local restaurateur in 2016. In 2013, Rimmer served as a judge for British Sausage Week, helping to choose the winners and promote the event.

Rimmer's television career began with Granada Breeze before appearing regularly on programmes including This Morning, The One Show, The Gadget Show & Pointless Celebrities. He has presented Making a Meal of It for BBC Two, Win It, Cook It, Tricks of the Restaurant Trade, Eat the Week with Iceland & Secrets of Our Favourite Snacks for Channel 4 & Breaking Into Tesco for Channel 5. Rimmer is, however, best known for his work alongside Tim Lovejoy with whom he presented Something for the Weekend on BBC Two between 2006 and 2012 & Sunday Brunch, a show with a similar format on Channel 4.

Rimmer has also appeared as a contestant on various TV shows. In 2006, he pitted his cooking talents against other skilled chefs on the first series of Great British Menu; losing in the North of England heat to Marcus Wareing.  In 2008, he appeared on Celebrity Mastermind, choosing 'The History of Tranmere Rovers' as a specialist subject. In August 2017, it was confirmed that Rimmer would take part in the fifteenth series of Strictly Come Dancing, partnered with Karen Clifton. The pair were eliminated in week six.

Rimmer's first book, The Accidental Vegetarian, was published in October 2004. His second book, Rebel Cook, was published in October 2006. His third book Lazy Brunch came out in spring 2008, co-written with Lovejoy and based on a feature in Something from the Weekend. In spring 2009, Rimmer published his fourth book, The Seasoned Vegetarian.

Personal life
Rimmer supports Liverpool and was present during the 1989 Hillsborough disaster.

Filmography
Television

Notes

References

External links
Greens Restaurant
Earle Restaurant
Eat The Chef - Video Recipes by Simon and others
Simon Rimmer recipes
The Cheshire Cookery School

1963 births
Living people
English chefs
English television chefs
People from Wallasey